Dave Gibson (17 February 1879 – 26 March 1953) was an Australian rules footballer who played with St Kilda in the Victorian Football League (VFL).

References

External links 

1879 births
1953 deaths
Australian rules footballers from Melbourne
St Kilda Football Club players
People educated at Melbourne Grammar School
People from East Melbourne